Molly Suzanne White (née Gosney; born February 26, 1958) is a former Republican member of the Texas House of Representatives. She represented District 55 for one term, from 2015 through 2017.

Political activism
On January 29, 2015, White put up an Israeli flag in her office, and instructed her staff to ask Muslim constituents participating in "Texas Muslim Capitol Day" to "announce publicly allegiance to the United States", causing controversy. Governor Greg Abbott distanced himself from White's remarks and called for "civil discourse" regarding matters of this kind. In a follow-up social media post in February, White stated that her remarks had been misrepresented. White explained that the "genesis" behind her statement was that the Council on American–Islamic Relations (CAIR), which "started Muslim Day at the Texas Capitol" is "designated as a terrorist group by the United Arab Emirates." PolitiFact quoted a city council leader as stating that CAIR was among the organizations that started the annual Muslim Day. CAIR is not designated as a terrorist organization by the United States.

In the 2016 Republican primary election, Hugh Shine defeated White by 118 votes. White requested a recount, which was granted; her loss was confirmed.

References

External links

1958 births
Living people
Republican Party members of the Texas House of Representatives
People from Belton, Texas
Businesspeople from Texas
Belton High School (Belton, Texas) alumni
University of Mary Hardin–Baylor alumni
Women state legislators in Texas
American anti-abortion activists
American lobbyists
Female critics of feminism
Eagle Forum
Tea Party movement activists
Activists from Texas
21st-century American politicians
21st-century American women politicians